Anielka Elter (1901-1958 in Kent, England) was a Czechoslovak motion picture actress who made films in Berlin, Germany and Hollywood.

Career 
Elter was a film star in Berlin before arriving in America from Poland. She had her first success in America with The Merry Widow (1925). She had an uncredited role as a blindfolded musician. The movie was directed by Erich Von Stroheim and starred Mae Murray, John Gilbert, and Tully Marshall.

Elter worked with film producer Sascha Kolowrat of Vienna, Austria, on several movie projects in association with the Berlin Film Manufacturing Company. She was chosen by Elinor Glyn to play the Bolshevik girl in The Only Thing (1925).

After making The Godless Girl (1929), Elter concluded her film career with three European screen productions. They are Sunding und suss (1929), Kajastus (1930), and Fantomas (1932).

Selected filmography
 The Merry Widow (1925)
 Sinful and Sweet (1929)
 Fantômas (1932)

References

Los Angeles Times, "Actress Learns Rapidly", January 25, 1925, Page 29.
Los Angeles Times, "How do you like these Newcomers?", March 25, 1925, Page C4.
Los Angeles Times, "Czech Actress Signed", April 27, 1925, Page 13.
Stevens Point, Wisconsin Daily Journal, "Oh, Those Eyes!", January 15, 1925, Page 3.

Czechoslovak actresses
1901 births
1958 deaths
Czechoslovak emigrants to the United States